Doğanşehir,, also known as Muhacir, Viransehir, Viranşehir, is a district of Malatya Province of Turkey. The mayor is Vahap Küçük (AKP). Historically the city was known as Sozopetra (Greek: Σωζόπετρα).

Geography
The altitude of the town in Malatya Province, 58 km away to the sea level elevation is 1,290 meters. Both Plains and mountains are part of the landscape to the east of the town of Adiyaman province, Çelikhan District, in southern province of Adiyaman and Gölbaşı Besni districts, west of Kahramanmaras Elbistan District, north east and Yeşilyurt Akçadağ districts are located.

 Latitude. 38.0919444°, Longitude. 37.8788889° 
 An artificial pond or lake at Polat Barajı, 12.2 km away, acts as the local resivior 
 A major stream 19.7 km away is an irrigation water channel cut in the land at Melet Deresi
 A local dam, which is a barrier constructed across one of the nearby streams to impound water is 19.6 km away at Sürgü Barajı  

The nearest towns are Altıntop (3.5 km away), Günedoğru (6 km away)  Çığlık (6.8 km away)

History
The 2nd-century geographer Claudius Ptolemy records the city as Zizoatra, part of the province of Lauiansene in Cappadocia. In Byzantine times, it was known as Sozopetra and Zapetra (in Arabic).

Demographics
 Area: 1290 km ²
 Total municipal Population: 60,708 (According to the 2000 General Population Census)
 City Population: 13,517 (according to the 2000 General Population Census)
 Population Density: 50 per km

The area of the town is 1,290 km ². General population according to year 2000 census total population of 60,708 and 13,517 population centres, villages and township population of 47,191 'roll', 5 district of the town, 6 of the municipality has 31 villages.

Dogansehir is in the same time zone as Istanbul.

Economy
Significant improvements in the fruit industry has made agriculture the District's most important source of income. It includes apricots and an increase in the production of apples. Livestock is usually farmed in the village. Both the district and the villages of central and traditional values, importance is given to local custom. Tourism, mountaineering and monitoring local wildlife are also new attractions.

Transport
The nearest railway/railroad station s located 13 km away at Kadılı İstasyonu and  18. 5 km away at  Suçatı İstasyonu. It has facilities comprising ticket office, platforms, etc. and handled train passengers and rail-freight. The local mountain passes are used for transportation from one side to the other of the local mountain ranges at Kömürcü Gediği (18.7 km away), Reşadiye Geçidi (23.2 km away)  and Bitme Geçidi (24.7 km away).

See also
 Anatolian Tigers

References

External sources
 Doğanşehirliler Derneği, Malatya
 Doğanşehir ilçe Emniyet Müdürlüğü

Populated places in Malatya Province
Districts of Malatya Province